İsmayılbəyli or Ismayilbeyli or Ismayilbayli may refer to:
İsmayılbəyli, Agdam, Azerbaijan
İsmayılbəyli, Tartar, Azerbaijan